Bunnell may refer to:

Companies 
Bunnell Incorporated, a medical equipment manufacturer

People
Charles Ragland Bunnell (1897–1968), American artist
Charles Sterling Bunnell (1901–1988), American banker
David Bunnell (1947–2016), technology entrepreneur
Dewey Bunnell (born 1951), member of the band America
Frank C. Bunnell, US Congressman from Pennsylvania
John Bunnell (born 1944), television personality and former law enforcement officer
Lafayette Bunnell (1824–1903), explorer
Omar B. Bunnell (1912-1992), American businessman and politician
Peter Bunnell (1937–2021), American author and professor of the history of photography
Bunnell Lewis (1824–1908), English archaeologist

Places
Bunnell, Florida, United States
Bunnell Point, a mountain in California

Schools
Frank Scott Bunnell High School, Stratford, Connecticut, USA

See also
 Bonnell (disambiguation)